Marcin Held (born January 18, 1992) is a Polish mixed martial artist who competes in the Lightweight division. He formerly competed in the Lightweight division of the Absolute Championship Berkut, Professional Fighters League, and Ultimate Fighting Championship. A professional MMA competitor since 2008, Held has competed frequently in his home country of Poland and is highly touted by the media, often being regarded as "the prodigy of Polish MMA". He fought in Bellator MMA from 2010 to 2016, challenging for the Bellator Lightweight Championship in 2015.

Background
Held began training in Submission grappling at the age of nine, with emphasis on submission wrestling controls and Sambo style leglock system. He also received a jiu-jitsu black belt at the age 21, becoming the youngest black belt in Poland. Held is well known for winning multiple submission grappling competitions in his home country. Since his MMA career has taken off, he still competes regularly in Submission Grappling, most notably for Quintet and Polaris. Though he fights at lightweight, he has expressed a desire to compete at featherweight, should the right fight become available.

Mixed martial arts career

Early career
Held began his professional mixed martial arts career and compiled a 3–0 record before joining Shooto. His debut fight for the organisation was at Shooto Poland, where he headlined and defeated Rafal Lasota via TKO (leg injury). Just prior to the Shooto fight, Held was named as one of the top ten unsigned prospects to watch for 2009.

In December 2009, Held competed in an eight-man tournament, defeating all three opponents; the latter two by submission. Following this, Held defeated Przemyslaw Zbiciak via submission (rear naked choke) midway through the first round.

Held's first professional loss came at the hands of Lukasz Sajewski, a fellow highly rated prospect from Poland. Sajewski was able to neutralise the submission game of Held, before gaining top position and riding out a unanimous decision victory.

Held rebounded to defeat the former Cage Rage Lightweight Champion Jean Silva. Held attacked his opponent with a lot of leg locks, Jean didn't tap very good leg lock and after he stand up he fall down because of knee injury. Held won the fight via TKO.

Held was scheduled to participate in the inaugural event of a new Polish promotion - Infinite Fighting Federation - in October in Dąbrowa Górnicza, against German fighter Franco de Leonardis. However, due to an accident involving de Leonardis, he faced Bojan Kosednar. Held won the fight with a kneebar submission in the second round.

According to mmarocks, Held signed a contract to compete against Juha-Pekka Vainikainen in November at Iron Fist 3. However, for unknown reasons, Held was forced to pull out of the fight and was replaced by Anthony Durnell.

Bellator MMA
On October 14, Held signed with Bellator MMA to compete in their Season Four Lightweight Tournament. He faced wrestler Michael Chandler in the opening quarterfinal round at Bellator 36. He lost via arm-triangle choke submission in the first round.

Held faced Phillipe Nover at Bellator 59. He won the fight via split decision (29–28, 29–28, 29–28).  Sherdog.com scored the bout 29-28 in favor of Nover.

Held faced Murad Machaev in the opening round of the Bellator Season 7 Lightweight Tournament Quarterfinal on October 19, 2012, at Bellator 77. He won the fight via unanimous decision. He faced Rich Clementi in the semifinals on November 16, 2012, at Bellator 81 and won via submission in the second round.

Held was expected to face Dave Jansen for the Season Seven Tournament Final at Bellator 84 but Held was not allowed in the Horseshoe casino, in Hammond, Indiana, where the event was being held since he was only 20 years old, and therefore the fight has been pushed to sometime during Bellator Fighting Championships: Season Eight.

The bout with Jansen was rescheduled for March 21, 2013, at Bellator 93. Held lost the fight via unanimous decision.

Held rebounded with a first-round KO win over Ryan Healy at Bellator 101.

Held next faced Rodrigo Cavalheiro in the Bellator Season 10 Lightweight Tournament quarterfinals at Bellator 113. He won the fight via submission in the first round. He faced Derek Anderson in the semifinals at Bellator 117 and won via submission in the second round. He faced Patricky Pitbull in the finals at Bellator 126 on September 26, 2014. Held dominated the fight and won via unanimous decision.

Held faced Alexander Sarnavskiy at Bellator 136 on April 10, 2015. He won the fight via verbal submission in the third round.

Held faced Will Brooks for the Bellator Lightweight Championship on November 6, 2015, at Bellator 145. Despite popping Brooks' knee in the opening round, Held lost the fight via unanimous decision.

Held had a rematch with Dave Jansen on May 20, 2016, at Bellator 155. He won the fight via unanimous decision. Despite getting the win, Bellator MMA announced they had released Held from his contract. Held, however, wrote a Facebook post citing that he terminated his own contract.

Ultimate Fighting Championship
On August 30, Held officially signed with the UFC.

Held made his promotional debut against UFC veteran Diego Sanchez on November 5, 2016, at The Ultimate Fighter Latin America 3 Finale. Despite having some success with his boxing and remaining active off his back looking for submissions, Held lost the bout by unanimous decision.

Held next faced Joe Lauzon on January 15, 2017, at UFC Fight Night 103. He lost the fight via a controversial split decision, with even his opponent Lauzon saying he felt he lost the bout post-fight. Likewise, 16 out of 17 media pundits scored the bout for Held; the lone holdout scored the fight a draw.

Held faced Damir Hadžović on May 28, 2017, at UFC Fight Night 109. After handily winning the first two rounds, he lost the fight via knockout in the opening seconds of the third round.

Held was expected to face Teemu Packalen on October 21, 2017, at UFC Fight Night 118. Teemu injured his knee and was replaced by Nasrat Haqparast. Held won the fight via unanimous decision to earn his first UFC win and fighting out his rookie contract.

Absolute Championship Berkut
Despite the UFC offering a new contract, Held decided to sign a contract with Absolute Championship Berkut and he faced Callan Potter in his debut at ACB 88. Held won the bout via submission in the first round.

Professional Fighters League 
In March 2020, Held signed with Professional Fighters League.

Held made his PFL debut against Natan Schulte on April 23, 2021, at PFL 1. He won the bout via unanimous decision.

Held faced Olivier Aubin-Mercier at PFL 4 on June 10, 2021. He lost the bout via unanimous decision.

Held faced Natan Schulte on June 17, 2022, at PFL 4. He lost the bout via unanimous decision.

Held faced Myles Price on August 13, 2022, at PFL 8. He won the bout via guillotine choke in the second round.

Championships and accomplishments

Mixed martial arts
Mixed Martial Arts Challengers
MMA Challengers 2 Lightweight Tournament Winner
Bellator Fighting Championships
Bellator Season 10 Lightweight Tournament Winner
Bellator Season 7 Lightweight Tournament Runner-Up
Tied (with Michael Chandler and Adam Piccolotti) for most submission victories in Bellator Lightweight division (five)

Submission grappling
ADCC Submission Wrestling World Championship
2011 ADCC Submission Wrestling Polish Championships Gold Medalist
2010 ADCC Submission Wrestling European Championships Bronze Medalist
International Federation of Associated Wrestling Styles
2011 FILA Grappling European Championships Senior No-Gi Gold Medalist
2010 FILA Grappling World Championships Senior Gi Silver Medalist
Polaris
2018 Polaris 6 - Defeated Chris Fishgold by Armbar

Brazilian Jiu-Jitsu
International Brazilian Jiu-Jitsu Federation
2010 IBJJF European Open Jiu-Jitsu Championships Purple Belt Gold Medalist
Federation International of Jiu-Jitsu Association
2012 FIJJA World Professional Jiu-Jitsu Cup Warsaw Trials Absolute Brown/Black Belt Runner-up
2012 FIJJA World Professional Jiu-Jitsu Cup Warsaw Trials Brown/Black Belt 3rd Place

Pankration
International Brazilian Jiu-Jitsu Federation
2010 FILA Pankration World Championships Senior Silver Medalist

Mixed martial arts record

|-
|Win
|align=center|28–9
|Myles Price
|Submission (guillotine choke)
|PFL 9
|
|align=center|2
|align=center|2:37
|London, England
|
|-
|Loss
|align=center|27–9
|Natan Schulte
|Decision (unanimous)
|PFL 4
|
|align=center|3
|align=center|5:00
|Atlanta, Georgia, United States
|
|-
|Loss
|align=center|27–8 
|Olivier Aubin-Mercier
|Decision (unanimous)
|PFL 4 
|
|align=center|3
|align=center|5:00
|Atlantic City, New Jersey, United States
|
|-
|Win
|align=center|27–7
|Natan Schulte
|Decision (unanimous)
|PFL 1
|
|align=center|3
|align=center|5:00
|Atlantic City, New Jersey, United States
|
|-
|Win
|align=center|26–7
|Diego Brandão
|Decision (unanimous)
|ACA 96: Goncharov vs. Johnson
|
|align=center|3
|align=center|5:00
|Lodz, Poland
|  
|-
|Win
|align=center| 25–7
|Musa Khamanaev
|Submission (heel hook)
||ACB 90 Moscow
|
|align=center| 1
|align=center|2:09
|Moscow, Russia
|
|-
|-
|Win
|align=center|24–7
|Callan Potter
|Submission (heel hook)
|ACB 88
|
|align=center|1
|align=center|1:09
|Brisbane, Australia
|
|-
|Win
|align=center|23–7
|Nasrat Haqparast
|Decision (unanimous)
|UFC Fight Night: Cowboy vs. Till
|
|align=center|3
|align=center|5:00
|Gdańsk, Poland
|
|-
|Loss
|align=center|22–7
|Damir Hadžović
|KO (knee)
|UFC Fight Night: Gustafsson vs. Teixeira
|
|align=center|3
|align=center|0:07
|Stockholm, Sweden
|
|-
|Loss
|align=center|22–6
|Joe Lauzon
|Decision (split)
|UFC Fight Night: Rodríguez vs. Penn
|
|align=center|3
|align=center|5:00
|Phoenix, Arizona, United States
|
|-
|Loss
|align=center|22–5
|Diego Sanchez
|Decision (unanimous)
|The Ultimate Fighter Latin America 3 Finale: dos Anjos vs. Ferguson
|
|align=center|3
|align=center|5:00
|Mexico City, Mexico
|
|-
|Win
|align=center|22–4
|Dave Jansen
|Decision (unanimous)
|Bellator 155
|
|align=center|3
|align=center|5:00
|Boise, Idaho, United States
|
|-
|Loss
|align=center|21–4
|Will Brooks
|Decision (unanimous)
|Bellator 145
|
|align=center|5
|align=center|5:00
|St. Louis, Missouri, United States
|
|-
|Win
|align=center|21–3
|Alexander Sarnavskiy
|Submission (kneebar)
|Bellator 136
|
|align=center|3
|align=center|1:11
|Irvine, California, United States
|
|-
|Win
|align=center|20–3
|Patricky Freire
|Decision (unanimous)
|Bellator 126
|
|align=center|3
|align=center|5:00
|Phoenix, Arizona, United States
|
|-
|Win
|align=center|19–3
|Nate Jolly
|Submission (armbar)
|Bellator 120
|
|align=center|1
|align=center|4:20
|Southaven, Mississippi, United States
|
|-
|Win
|align=center|18–3
|Derek Anderson
|Submission (triangle choke)
|Bellator 117
|
|align=center|2
|align=center|3:07
|Council Bluffs, Iowa, United States
|
|-
|Win
|align=center|17–3
|Rodrigo Cavalheiro
|Submission (toe hold)
|Bellator 113
|
|align=center|1
|align=center|1:56
|Mulvane, Kansas, United States
|
|-
|Win
|align=center|16–3
|Ryan Healy
|KO (punches)
|Bellator 101
|
|align=center|1
|align=center|1:12
|Portland, Oregon, United States
|
|-
|Loss
|align=center|15–3
|Dave Jansen
|Decision (unanimous)
|Bellator 93
|
|align=center|3
|align=center|5:00
|Lewiston, Maine, United States
|
|-
|Win
|align=center|15–2
|Rich Clementi
|Submission (toe hold)
|Bellator 81
|
|align=center|2
|align=center|3:04
|Kingston, Rhode Island, United States
|
|-
|Win
|align=center|14–2
|Murad Machaev
|Decision (unanimous)
|Bellator 77
|
|align=center|3
|align=center|5:00
|Reading, Pennsylvania, United States
|
|-
|Win
|align=center|13–2
|Derrick Kennington
|Submission (heel hook)
|Bellator 68
|
|align=center|1
|align=center|2:08
|Atlantic City, New Jersey, United States
|
|-
|Win
|align=center|12–2
|Phillipe Nover
|Decision (split)
|Bellator 59
|
|align=center|3
|align=center|5:00
|Atlantic City, New Jersey, United States
|
|-
|Win
|align=center|11–2
|Kaleo Kwan
|Submission (inverted heel hook)
|AFC 2: Lombard vs. Taylor
|
|align=center|1
|align=center|0:55
|Melbourne, Australia
|
|-
|Loss
|align=center|10–2
|Michael Chandler
|Technical Submission (arm triangle choke)
|Bellator 36
|
|align=center|1
|align=center|3:56
|Shreveport, Louisiana, United States
|
|-
|Win
|align=center|10–1
|Bojan Kosednar
|Submission (kneebar)
|Infinite Fighting Federation
|
|align=center|2
|align=center|3:24
|Dąbrowa Górnicza, Poland
|
|-
|Win
|align=center|9–1
|Jean Silva
|TKO (knee injury)
|Pro Fight 5
|
|align=center|2
|align=center|2:30
|Wrocław, Poland
|
|-
|Loss
|align=center|8–1
|Łukasz Sajewski
|Decision (unanimous)
|AOF 7: Support for Haiti
|
|align=center|2
|align=center|5:00
|Płock, Poland
|
|-
|Win
|align=center|8–0
|Przemysław Zbiciak
|Submission (rear-naked choke)
|Ring XF 1: First Battle
|
|align=center|1
|align=center|3:11
|Zgierz, Poland
|
|-
|Win
|align=center|7–0
|Borys Mańkowski
|Submission (armbar)
|MMA Challengers 2
|
|align=center|1
|align=center|2:10
|Bytom, Poland
|
|-
|Win
|align=center|6–0
|Mariusz Abramiak
|Submission (rear-naked choke)
|MMA Challengers 2
|
|align=center|1
|align=center|3:23
|Bytom, Poland
|
|-
|Win
|align=center|5–0
|Ireneusz Mila
|Decision (unanimous)
|MMA Challengers 2
|
|align=center|2
|align=center|4:00
|Bytom, Poland
|
|-
|Win
|align=center|4–0
|Rafał Lasota
|TKO (leg injury)
|Shooto Poland: Held vs. Lasota
|
|align=center|3
|align=center|N/A
|Kielce, Poland
|
|-
|Win
|align=center|3–0
|Mariusz Pioskowik
|TKO (punches)
|Bytomska: Gala MMA 2
|
|align=center|2
|align=center|2:49
|Bytom, Poland
|
|-
|Win
|align=center|2–0
|Artur Sowiński
|Decision (majority)
|MMA Challengers 1
|
|align=center|2
|align=center|5:00
|Mysłowice, Poland
|
|-
|Win
|align=center|1–0
|Mateusz Piórkowski
|Submission (armbar)
|Abak Moto
|
|align=center|1
|align=center|4:01
|Muchowiec, Poland
|

Submission grappling record
KO PUNCHES
|- style="text-align:center; background:#f0f0f0;"
| style="border-style:none none solid solid; "|Result
| style="border-style:none none solid solid; "|Marcin Najman
| style="border-style:none none solid solid; "|Method
| style="border-style:none none solid solid; "|Event
| style="border-style:none none solid solid; "|Date
| style="border-style:none none solid solid; "|Round
| style="border-style:none none solid solid; "|Time
| style="border-style:none none solid solid; "|Notes
|-
|Draw|| Marius Žaromskis || Draw || Quintet || April 11, 2018|| 1|| 10:00||
|-
|Win|| Teodoras Aukstuolis || Submission (kneebar) || Quintet || April 11, 2018|| 1|| ||
|-
|Win|| Viktor Tomasevic || Submission (kneebar) || Quintet || April 11, 2018|| 1|| ||

See also
 List of male mixed martial artists

References

External links
 Marcin Held at PFL
 
 

1992 births
Living people
Polish male mixed martial artists
Lightweight mixed martial artists
Mixed martial artists utilizing pankration
Mixed martial artists utilizing Brazilian jiu-jitsu
Polish practitioners of Brazilian jiu-jitsu
People awarded a black belt in Brazilian jiu-jitsu
People from Tychy
Sportspeople from Silesian Voivodeship
Ultimate Fighting Championship male fighters